Robert Van de Noort is a Dutch historian and archaeologist who is the Vice-Chancellor and the Chief Executive of the University of Reading.  He is the chair of the Thames Regional Flood and Coastal Committee (RFCC). He worked at the University of Exeter (2000–14) where he was the dean of the College of Social Sciences and International Studies. Van de Noort worked from 1988 to 1989 at the British School in Rome, from 1989 to 1991 at the Rotterdam Archaeology Unit, and then he went to the University of Hull (1992–2000). He is a Fellow of the Society of Antiquaries of London and a Principal Fellow of the Higher Education Academy.

Early career 
Van de Noort studied History at the University of Utrecht and Archaeology at the University of Amsterdam. He worked at the British School in Rome (1988–89), and the Rotterdam Archaeology Unit (1989–1991) before moving to Britain where he became the manager of the Humber Wetlands Project (1992–2000) and the director of the Centre for Wetland Archaeology (1996–2000), both at the University of Hull.

In 2001 he was appointed Senior Lecturer in Archaeology at the University of Exeter, moving on to became Head of Department and then Head of the School of Geography, Archaeology and Earth Resources from 2003 to 2008. He also was the university's Dean of the Faculty of Graduate Research and the Dean of the College of Social Sciences and International Studies.

In 2021, as Vice-Chancellor at Reading, Van de Noort was involved in controversy with the students' union over tuition fee refunds. He refused the union's request to cancel tutition fees for the year, following concerns over online teaching during the COVID-19 pandemic and reduced contact time.

References

Vice-Chancellors of the University of Reading
20th-century Dutch  archaeologists
Year of birth missing (living people)
Living people